The Lady Davis Fellow is a program of The Lady Davis Foundation for the scholars to carry out research in various areas on the campuses of the Hebrew University of Jerusalem and the Technion - Israel Institute of Technology in Israel. The Lady Davis Fellows are selected on the basis of demonstrated talent and promising ideas for their research. The Lady Davis Foundation also provide fellowships for visiting professors along with postdoctoral and doctoral researchers. The fellowships are initially provided for the period of one year. To date, the foundation has supported about 1700 scholars all around the world including visiting professors, postdoctoral and doctoral researchers in Science, Engineering, Arts and Literature to serve as a Lady Davis Fellow.  The fellowship is named after the wife of Sir Mortimer Davis, Henriette Marie Meyer.

Notable Fellows
Lawrence D. Brown (visiting professor)
Ofer Feldman (visiting professor)
 Paul B. Fenton (visiting professor)
 Richard M. Karp (visiting professor)
 Peter J. Stang (visiting professor)
 Eiichi Nakamura (chemist) (visiting professor)
 Carl M. Bender (visiting professor)
 Ruth Pachter
Gadi Rothenberg (visiting professor)
 Eric Weinstein (visiting professor)
 Norman Stillman (visiting professor)
 Kendall Houk (visiting professor)
 Samuel L. Braunstein
 Anne Bayefsky (visiting professor)
 Paul W. Franks
 Ingram Olkin (visiting professor)
 Michael D. Fried (visiting professor)
 Włodzimierz Julian Korab-Karpowicz (visiting professor)
 Paul Goldberg (geologist)
 Steven B. Bowman
 Aaron W. Hughes (visiting professor)
 Yael S. Feldman
 Joanna B. Michlic
 Mario Szegedy
 John A. Stanturf
 Charles Blattberg (visiting professor)
 Jan-Erik Lane (visiting professor)
 Shaye J. D. Cohen (visiting professor)
 Marshall Jordan Breger (visiting professor)
 Igor Rivin (visiting professor)
 Tomek Bartoszyński (visiting professor)
 Paul Wiegmann
 Jeffrey R. Wool
 Yin Xiaowei
 Daniel Sinausia

References

External links
 Official website

Fellowships
Technion – Israel Institute of Technology
Hebrew University of Jerusalem